Electronica 2: The Heart of Noise is the eighteenth studio album of French electronic musician and composer Jean-Michel Jarre, released on 6 May 2016 by Columbia Records. It is the second of a two-part album (the first being Electronica 1: The Time Machine) that is based around collaborations with other electronic musicians from a wide range of decades and styles.

Electronica 1 included artists such as Vince Clarke, Gesaffelstein, M83, Armin van Buuren, John Carpenter, 3D (of Massive Attack), Pete Townshend, Tangerine Dream, and others, while Electronica 2 includes collaborations with Pet Shop Boys, Rone, Julia Holter, Primal Scream, Gary Numan, Hans Zimmer, Edward Snowden, Peaches, Sébastien Tellier, The Orb, Siriusmo, Yello, Jeff Mills, Cyndi Lauper and Christophe. In all, the two-album collaboration has some 30 collaborators, and Jarre has described it as his "most ambitious project."

The name of the album, its album art as well as its full track and collaboration listings were revealed to the public on 19 February 2016. The album was nominated for the 2017 Victoires de la musique award in France, in the Album de musiques électroniques ou dance category.

Track listing

 "As One" contains samples from "Come Together" by Primal Scream

Charts

Certifications

References

2016 albums
Jean-Michel Jarre albums
Sequel albums
Columbia Records albums